São João do Pau d'Alho is a municipality in the state of São Paulo in Brazil. The population is 2,100 (2020 est.) in an area of 118 km². The elevation is 354 m.

The municipality contains 2.24% of the  Aguapeí State Park, created in 1998.
It contains part of the  Mouth of the Aguapeí Private Natural Heritage Reserve, created in 2010.

References

Municipalities in São Paulo (state)